Independence Day (also known as Hari Kebangsaan or "National Day"), is the official independence day of Malaya. It commemorates the Malayan Declaration of Independence of 31 August 1957, and is defined in Article 160 of the Constitution of Malaysia. The day is marked by official and unofficial ceremonies and observances across the country.

The observation of 31 August as Malaysia's national day is the cause of some controversy, due to calls to prioritize the celebration of Hari Malaysia (Malaysia Day) on 16 September instead. Hari Malaysia commemorates the formation of Malaysia in 1963, when the four entities of North Borneo, Sarawak,  Singapore and Malaya federated to form Malaysia. Some, especially people from East Malaysia, argue that it is illogical to celebrate 31 August 1957 as Malaysia's national day when Malaysia was only established in 1963. Supporters of Hari Merdeka argue that "the Federation" as defined in Article 160 of the Constitution of Malaysia is the "Federation of Malaya" that was established in 1957.

Events leading up to independence 
The effort for independence was spearheaded by Tunku Abdul Rahman, the first Prime Minister of Malaysia, who led a delegation of ministers and political leaders of Malaya in negotiations with the British in London for Merdeka, or independence along with the first president of the Malaysian Chinese Association (MCA) Tun Dato Sri Tan Cheng Lock and fifth President of Malaysian Indian Congress Tun V. T. Sambanthan. Once it became clear that the Communist threat posed during the Malayan Emergency was petering out, an agreement was reached on 8 February 1956, for Malaya to gain independence from the British Empire. However, logistical and administrative reasons led to the official proclamation of independence in the next year, on 31 August 1957, at Stadium Merdeka (Independence Stadium), in Kuala Lumpur, which was purposely built for the celebrations of the national independence day. The announcement of the day was set months earlier by Tunku Abdul Rahman in a meeting of the Alliance in Malacca in February 1957.

Independence Day (31 August 1957)
On the night of 30 August 1957, more than 20,000 people gathered at Merdeka Square (Dataran Merdeka) in Kuala Lumpur to witness the handover of power from the British. Prime Minister-designate Tunku Abdul Rahman arrived at 11:58 p.m. and joined members of the Alliance Party's youth divisions in observing two minutes of darkness. On the stroke of midnight, the lights were switched back on, and the Union Flag in the square was lowered as the royal anthem "God Save The Queen" played. The new Flag of Malaya was raised as the national anthem Negaraku was played. This was followed by seven chants of "Merdeka" by the crowd. Tunku Abdul Rahman later gave a speech hailing the ceremony as the "greatest moment in the life of the Malayan people". Before giving the address to the crowd, he was given a necklace by representatives of the Alliance Party youth in honour of this great occasion in history, with a map of Malaya inscribed on it. The event ended at one in the morning.

On the morning of 31 August 1957, the festivities moved to the newly completed Merdeka Stadium. More than 20,000 people witnessed the ceremony, which began at 9:30 am. Those in attendance included rulers of the Malay states, foreign dignitaries, members of the federal cabinet, and citizens. The Queen's representative, the Duke of Gloucester presented Tunku Abdul Rahman with the instrument of independence. Tunku then proceeded to read the Proclamation of Independence, which culminated in the chanting of "Merdeka!" seven times with the crowd joining in. The ceremony continued with the raising of the National Flag of Malaya accompanied by the national anthem being played by a military band and a 21-gun salute, followed by an azan call and a thanksgiving prayer in honour of this great occasion.

The day followed with the solemn installation of the first Yang di-Pertuan Agong, Tuanku Abdul Rahman of Negeri Sembilan, at Jalan Ampang, and the first installation banquet in his honour in the evening followed by a beating retreat performance and a fireworks display. Sports events and other events marked the birth of the new nation.

Attendees
The foreign guests of honour included: 
Members of royal families
 The King and Queen of Thailand
 The Crown Prince and Princess of Japan
 The Duke and Duchess of Gloucester (representing The Queen)
 Prince William of Gloucester
Heads of government
 The Prime Minister of South Africa, Johannes Gerhardus Strijdom
 The Prime Minister of India, Jawaharlal Nehru
 The Prime Minister of Pakistan, Huseyn Shaheed Suhrawardy    
 The Prime Minister of Vietnam, Phạm Văn Đồng 
 The Prime Minister of Ceylon, Solomon Bandaranaike  
 The Prime Minister of Burma, U Nu 
 The Prime Minister of Cambodia, Sim Var
 The United States Secretary of State, John Foster Dulles (representing US President Dwight D. Eisenhower)
Representatives from other British colonies
 The Governor of Hong Kong, Sir Alexander Grantham
 The Chief Minister of Singapore, Lim Yew Hock
Members of the former British colonial administration
 Sir Gerald Templer (former British High Commissioner in Malaya) and Lady Templer 
 Lady Gurney (wife of former British High Commissioner in Malaya Sir Henry Gurney)
 Lady Gent (wife of former British High Commissioner in Malaya Sir Edward Gent)
High Commissioners of other Commonwealth countries
 High Commissioner of Canada to Malaya, Arthur Redpath Menzies
 High Commissioner of Australia to Malaya, Tom Critchley
 High Commissioner of New Zealand to Malaya, Foss Shanahan

The formation of Malaysia

The Federation of Malaysia, comprising the states of the Federation of Malaya, North Borneo, Sarawak and Singapore, was officially declared on 31 August 1963, on the 6th anniversary of Malayan independence. However, it was postponed to 16 September 1963, mainly due to Indonesian and the Philippines' opposition to the formation of Malaysia. Nevertheless, North Borneo and Singapore declared sovereignty on 31 August 1963. Indonesian opposition later escalated to a military conflict. Indonesia considered Malaysia as a new form of colonisation on Sarawak and North Borneo, which bordered Indonesian territory on Borneo. However, they did not lay claim upon the two territories, unlike the Philippines which claimed the eastern part of Sabah. To assure Indonesia that Malaysia was not a form of neocolonialism, a general survey (instead of a referendum) was organised by the United Nations involving interviews of approximately 4,000 people, which received 2,200 memorandums from groups and private individuals. The Cobbold Commission, led by Lord Cobbold, was also formed to determine whether the people of North Borneo and Sarawak wished to join Malaysia. Their eventual findings, which indicated substantial support for Malaysia among the peoples of Sabah and Sarawak, cleared the way for the final proclamation of Malaysia.

The formation of the Federation of Malaysia was announced on 16 September 1963, the anniversary of which is celebrated as Malaysia Day. Hari Merdeka continued to be celebrated on 31 August, the original independence date of Malaya, while Malaysia Day became a public holiday only in East Malaysia. This caused discontent among East Malaysians in particular, it being sometimes felt that celebrating the national day on 31 August is Malaya-centric. In 2009, it was decided that starting 2010, Malaysia Day would be a nationwide public holiday in addition to Hari Merdeka on 31 August.

Themes 

The 2012 theme proved to be controversial, as it was seen by many Malaysians to be a political slogan rather than a patriotic one (Janji Ditepati was Najib Razak's campaign jingle in the run-up to the 2013 elections). The official "logo" was also ridiculed for its unconventional design. A video of the theme song uploaded on YouTube (with lyrics penned by Rais Yatim) garnered an overwhelming number of "dislikes" because of its overtly political content, which had nothing to do with the spirit of independence. The video has since been taken down.

The 2020 Malaysia Prihatin theme had been chosen because of the COVID-19 pandemic and in recognition of the caring and concerned of all Malaysian. In 2021, despite the theme and logo remained the same, but the theme song changed from Malaysia Prihatin (sung by Aliff Satar, Syamel, Siti Sarah, and Aina Abdul for original version, and Ernie Zakri for symphony version) to Menang Bersama (sung by Faizal Tahir), symbolizing the National Recovery Plan (Pelan Pemulihan Negara) theme, Malaysia Menang Bersama (English: Malaysia Winning Together).

2022 marks the first ever parade to be held after 2 years of hiatus caused by the pandemic, which was themed Keluarga Malaysia Teguh Bersama. A number of nearly 20,000 participants of various contingents involved in the parade.

Google doodle
On 31 August 2019, Google celebrated Malaysia's Independence Day, the 'Hari Merdeka' with a Doodle depicting Malaysia's national flower. The accompanying write up read as, "Today's Doodle depicts Malaysia's national flower in honor of Malaysia's Independence Day, known locally as Hari Merdeka. On this day in 1957, the Federation of Malaya became a sovereign state after many years of British rule. Tunku Abdul Rahman, Malaysia's first Chief Minister, read an official declaration at Kuala Lumpur's Stadium Merdeka before a crowd of some 20,000 people."

2015 Hari Merdeka Anniversary Issues
Legally, Hari Merdeka is the official independence day of 'the federation' as defined in the Article 160 of the Constitution of Malaysia, which was that established under the Federation of Malaya Agreement 1957. However, beginning in 2015, in a policy announced by the then Minister of Communication and Multimedia Ahmad Shabery Cheek, Hari Merdeka celebrations are to be held without mentioning the number of years since independence. This is to be more inclusive of Sabah and Sarawak, who left British rule in a different year.

The Minister of Land Development of Sarawak, the late James Jemut Masing, responded to this announcement by stating that Malaysia Day on 16 September should be the rallying point for the nation's unity, rather than Hari Merdeka. He added "Everyone now knows that 31 August is Malaya's and Sabah's Independence Day… it's not our (Sarawak) independence day. They can celebrate it both in Malaya and in Sabah as they have the same Independence Day date, and we can join them there if they invite us. We must right the wrong".

.

See also
 Hari Merdeka Parade
 North Borneo Self-government Day
 Sarawak Self-government Day
 Malaysia Day
 Merdeka 118

References

External links

 Merdeka proclamation on YouTube video
 Theme and Logo for Hari Kebangsaan

August observances
Malaysia
British Malaya
1957 in Malaya
Malaysian Independence
Public holidays in Malaysia